Floyd Karker Richtmyer (October 12, 1881 – November 7, 1939) was a physicist and educator in the United States.

Biography
Richtmyer was born October 12, 1881, in the rural community of Cobleskill, New York.
He studied with Perley Nutting at Cornell University; both were students of Edward L. Nichols. Richtmyer graduated with his A.B. in 1904 and Ph.D. in 1910.
He taught physics at Drexel University, but returned to Cornell as instructor in 1906, where he remained for the duration of his career.
He became assistant professor of physics in 1911, full professor in 1918, and  then dean of the graduate school in 1931.
He also taught summer classes at the University of California, Berkeley, Stanford University, and Columbia University. Richtmyer is an honorary member of Sigma Pi Sigma the physics honors society.

When the new Journal of the Optical Society of America (JOSA) began in 1917, Richtmyer wrote the very first article, on page 1  of volume 1, titled "Opportunities for Research."
In 1918 and 1919, he served as OSA’s vice president, and president in 1920. In 1928, he published a very popular textbook Introduction to Modern Physics (with E.H.Kennard,T. Lauritsen and John N. Cooper in later revisions). In 1933, he succeeded Paul Foote as editor of JOSA, and he served until his death. He published 11 items in JOSA, mostly in the period between 1922 and 1929.

His son Robert Davis Richtmyer was also a physicist and mathematician. He had a daughter Sarah R. Richtmyer who married John T. Mann, and another son Lawson E. Richtmyer. In 1929 he was awarded the Louis E. Levy Medal of the Franklin Institute for the study of X-rays.

After his death from a coronary thrombosis on November 7, 1939, the American Association of Physics Teachers, which he had helped form, established the Richtmyer Memorial Award, which is conferred annually, and is typically given to educators who have made outstanding contributions as teachers in their fields. It is awarded to those who have not only produced important current research in physics, but to those who have, by means of communication to both students and other educators, imparted information and motivation to participants in the field. Winners deliver the Richtmyer Memorial Lecture.

See also
Optical Society of America#Past Presidents of the OSA

References

External links
 
Past Presidents of the Optical Society of America

20th-century American physicists
Cornell University alumni
Cornell University faculty
Columbia University faculty
Presidents of Optica (society)
1881 births
1939 deaths
Philanthropists from New York (state)
People from Cobleskill, New York
Scientists from New York (state)
20th-century American philanthropists
Optical physicists
Presidents of the American Physical Society